David Thorpe (born 1972, London, UK) is an artist based in London.

Thorpe received his BA degree in 1994 from Humberside University and his MA degree in 1998 from Goldsmiths, University of London.

He has shown work in various exhibitions including Die Young Stay Pretty at the ICA, London, at Schirn Kunsthalle in Frankfurt, Monica de Cardenas in Milan and Murray Guy in New York City. Thorpe participated in British Art Show 6 at various venues. He exhibited at the Chisenhale Gallery with Unit.

References

David Thorpe – Saatchi Gallery

1972 births
20th-century English painters
English male painters
21st-century English painters
Living people
Alumni of Goldsmiths, University of London
Alumni of the University of Lincoln
English contemporary artists
20th-century English male artists
21st-century English male artists